Y combinator may refer to:

 Y Combinator, an American tech startup accelerator 
 Y combinator, a fixed-point combinator in untyped lambda calculus